Sudan is a 1945 American Technicolor adventure film directed by John Rawlins and starring Maria Montez, Jon Hall and Turhan Bey.

It was the last film Montez made for over a year due to fights with Universal.

Plot
Young, lovely Naila becomes queen of the ancient Egyptian kingdom of Khemis when her father is killed in a slave revolt. Continuing her penchant for going incognito among the people, she seeks out rebel leader Herua. But through palace treachery, she herself is captured and enslaved. After various adventures, she finds herself rescued by (and attracted to) the very rebel she was seeking. Will gratitude or revenge win out?

Cast
 Maria Montez as Queen Naila
 Jon Hall as Merab
 Turhan Bey as Herua
 Andy Devine as Nebka
 George Zucco as Horadef
 Robert Warwick as Maatet
 Philip Van Zandt as Setna (as Phil Van Zandt)
 Harry Cording as Uba
 George Lynn as Bata
 Charles Arnt as Khafre
 James Dime as a guard
 Tor Johnson as a slaver

Production
During development the film was called The Queen of the Nile. It was described as a "successor to Arabian Nights".

Production began in June 1944. In January of the following year the title was changed to Sudan.

It was the one collaboration between Montez and Hall where she wound up with another man at the end (Bey).

References

External links

Sudan at TCMDB
Review of film at Variety

1945 films
Films set in ancient Egypt
1940s adventure drama films
American adventure drama films
1945 drama films
Films directed by John Rawlins
1940s English-language films
1940s American films